Niklas Larsson (born 31 March 1989) is a Swedish motorcycle speedway rider who won the Team U-19 European Champion title in 2008.

Career details

World Championships 
 Individual U-21 World Championship
 2008 - 8th place in Qualifying Round 5

European Championships 
 Individual U-19 European Championship
 2008 - 10th place in Semi-Final 2
 Team U-19 European Championship
 2008 -  Rawicz - European Champion (0 heats)

See also 
 Sweden national speedway team

References 

Swedish speedway riders
Team Speedway Junior European Champions
1989 births
Living people